Xiao Minglin (born 3 October 1964) is a Chinese weightlifter. He competed in the men's lightweight event at the 1988 Summer Olympics.

References

1964 births
Living people
Chinese male weightlifters
Olympic weightlifters of China
Weightlifters at the 1988 Summer Olympics
Place of birth missing (living people)
20th-century Chinese people